Stephanie Blake (born August 21, 1954), also known as Cimarron, is an American burlesque performer and actress. She is known for playing the role of the nurse who came to Ferris' house in Ferris Bueller's Day Off

Life and career
Blake was born in Texas and grew up in Kansas City, Missouri. She started performing burlesque at nightclubs with the help of her mother, who was also an exotic dancer. Blake then moved to Las Vegas where she continued performing while also taking acting lessons, before moving to Los Angeles to further pursue her acting career. She credits her ability to land television acting work to her experience as an exotic performer. Blake ran the club The Star Strip in west Hollywood, during the 1980s. She was crowned Miss Exotic World in 1997 and 1998.

Blake had a memorable role as an singing nurse in Ferris Bueller's Day Off. She has also appeared in films such as The Sure Thing, The Mambo Kings, The Invisible Maniac, Lost in the Pershing Point Hotel, and Cake: A Wedding Story.

References

External links
 
 Stephanie Blake, 6th annual New Orleans Burlesque Festival

Living people
American film actresses
American television actresses
American neo-burlesque performers
Actresses from Texas
Miss Exotic World winners
American beauty pageant winners
21st-century American women
1954 births